K. International School Tokyo (KIST, ケイ・インターナショナルスクール東京 Kei Intānashonaru Sukūru Tōkyō) is a private, non-denominational international school located in Tokyo, Japan, founded in 1997 by Yoshishige and Takako Komaki. the school caters to over 600 students representing a wide range of different nationalities. KIST was the first school in Tokyo and the Kanto region, and the second school in Japan authorized by the International Baccalaureate to offer the three inquiry-based learning programmes for grades 9 and 10. The language of instruction is English. The school is accredited by the Council of International Schools.

The campus has several of the original buildings but opened a new section in August 2009. The elementary school was featured on ABC News where KIST students were interviewed about the UK Royal Wedding between Prince William and Kate Middleton, to show Japanese school children's impressions, on March 28, 2011.

History

Source for table:

Mathematics and English

 
The school follows the Key Stage 1 and 2 curriculum at the elementary level, and the Key Stage 3 curriculum and Edexcel International GCSE. The school offers an English strengthening program, Learning Enhancement Academic Program (LEAP), aimed at students whose English skills are lacking.

School building and facilities
 
The school consists of three buildings: elementary building, main building, and gymnasium.

The elementary building is used by students in the Primary Years Program.

The main building, also known as the secondary building, contains the main office, science laboratories, and the library. It is used by students in the Middle Years Program / Diploma Program. The building was previously used by a Japanese public school.

The gymnasium contains stages and a basketball court. The gymnasium has bathrooms, equipment storage, and changing rooms for students.

Internet and computers
 
The school provides free Wi-Fi for enrolled students. Laptops are available on each floor of the Elementary School and from the library center in the Secondary School. From 9th grade, students are required to bring their own personal laptop to school.

References

External links
 

Elementary schools in Japan
International schools in Tokyo
Private schools in Tokyo
International Baccalaureate schools in Japan
Kōtō